God Says No is the fifth studio album by American rock band Monster Magnet. It was released in 2000 in the UK and 2001 in the US. It was a commercial failure compared to their previous album, Powertrip. It was their last release recorded for A&M Records, due to problems with promotion of the album but it reached #17 in Germany.  It would also be the last release with bassist Joe Calandra and drummer Jon Kleiman.

The track "Medicine", which appears on the US release, is a re-recording of a track which originally appeared on the band's 1991 album Spine of God. A music video was made for the 1991 version.

Two different music videos were produced for the song "Heads Explode" and one for "Melt", consisting mostly of live footage over the studio version of the track.

UK Track listing
All tracks written by Dave Wyndorf.

"I Want More" is a cover of the Union Carbide Productions song "Financial Declaration".

US track listing

Personnel
Dave Wyndorf - vocals, guitar
Ed Mundell - lead guitar
Phil Caivano - guitar
Joe Calandra - bass
Jon Kleiman - drums

Charts

Weekly charts

Album Notes
"Heads Explode" was featured on the soundtrack for the movie Dracula 2000 and "Silver Future" was featured on the soundtrack for the movie Heavy Metal 2000.
The lyrics to "Melt" feature a reference to comic book pioneer Jack Kirby:  "...I was thinking how the world should have cried // On the day Jack Kirby died..."

References

Monster Magnet albums
2000 albums
A&M Records albums